Charles or Chuck Conner, Conners, Connor, or Connors could refer to:

 Charles Connor (MP) (1840–1914), Irish member of Parliament
 Charles Fremont Conner (1857–1905), American artist
 Chuck Connors (1921–1992), American TV actor and professional athlete
 Charles Connor (1935–2021), American R&B drummer who worked with Little Richard
 Charles Franklin Conner (born 1957), American lobbyist, Former U.S. Deputy Secretary of Agriculture, Former Acting Secretary of Agriculture
 Stompin' Tom Connors (Charles Thomas Connors, 1936–2013), Canadian country and folk musician
 Charles Raymond Connors, American jazz trombonist, member of Duke Ellington's orchestra
 George Washington "Chuck" Connors, American Tammany Hall politician

See also
Charles Conner (disambiguation)
Charles O'Conor (disambiguation)
Charles O'Connor (disambiguation)